Shruti Sinha is an Indian television personality known for winning Splitsvilla 11 and participating in Roadies Xtreme and Ace Of Space 2.

Career
Sinha started her career as a dancer in 2015 as a dancer in Dance India Dance's fifth season where she emerged as one of the top 15 contestants. Later, she featured in an episode of MTV India's show Love On The Run.

Sinha rose to fame when she participated in MTV Roadies Xtreme in 2018. She finished there as a semi-finalist.

In 2019, she participated in MTV Splitsvilla (season 11) where she became the winner along with Gaurav Alugh.

She participated in MTV Ace of Space 2 in 2019 where she emerged as a finalist.

Sinha made her Bollywood debut through Mumbai Saga's song Shor Machega by Yo Yo Honey Singh and Hommie Dilliwala.

Television

Filmography

Web

References

Year of birth missing (living people)
Living people
Indian television actresses
Indian dancers
21st-century Indian women